Bhuwan Chand (born June, 1949) is a Nepali actress. She is known for Aama, the first Nepali feature film which was produced in 1964. Owing to her lead role in the first feature film produced in Nepal, which was produced by the Nepal government, she is known as the first actress of Nepal.
Her other works include Hijo, Aaja, Bholi (1967), Manko Baandh (1973), Sindoor (1980), Jivan Rekha, Ke ghar ke dera (1987), Pachchis Basanta (1988) and Santideep (1989) among others.

Chand is one of the leading faces of Rastriya Nachghar, the iconic national theatre on Nepal. She is also set to receive "Extraordinary Services Award (Actress), 2019" from the Film Development Board, in its 19th anniversary celebration event.

Personal life
She was born on 14 June 1949 (1 Ashadh 2006 BS) in Kuslechaur, Kathmandu, Nepal. She has received a Matric, IA and a Sr. Diploma in Kathak dance. She is the granddaughter of Late Padma Bahadur Thapa, and daughter of Gujeshwari Thapa and Bhairab Bahadur Thapa. Her father was a singer in Radio Nepal. She married Michael Chand in 1976.

References

External links

Living people
1949 births
Actors from Kathmandu
Nepalese film actresses
Actresses in Nepali cinema
20th-century Nepalese actresses